Ingus Jakovičs (born 18 April 1993) is a Latvian professional basketball guard who last played for CSP Limoges of the LNB Pro A. He is also a member of the Latvian national basketball team.

Professional career 
Jakovičs started playing basketball for BK Gulbenes Buki in Latvian Basketball League 2nd division. In 2010, he spent a season with BAA Riga, which was a youth team that played in LBL D2. Year later he moved to BK Liepājas Lauvas where he played until end of the 2013 when his contract was bought out by VEF Rīga.

On 3 January 2014 he signed with VEF Rīga until the end of 2015–16 season.

On 5 August 2019 he signed with Pallacanestro Varese of the Lega Basket Serie A.

At the end of February 2021, Jakovičs received a more appealing offer from Budivelnyk, and on 25 February 2021 he signed and moved to Kyiv. On 30 November 2021 Jakovičs signed with Valmiera Glass ViA of the LEBL.

On 1 February 2022 he signed with CSP Limoges of the LNB Pro A.

International career 
In July 2013, Jakovičs helped the Latvian U20 team to reach the U20 European Championship finals. During this tournament he averaged 13.6 points, 3.5 assists and 2.5 rebounds. On 14 July 2014 he made his debut for the senior Latvian National Team in a win over Estonia.

References

External links 
Eurobasket.com Profile
Latvian National Team profile
basket.lv Profile

1993 births
Living people
BC Nizhny Novgorod players
BK Liepājas Lauvas players
BK VEF Rīga players
BK Ventspils players
Latvian men's basketball players
Lega Basket Serie A players
Limoges CSP players
Pallacanestro Varese players
People from Madona
Point guards